Ladera Ranch is a master-planned community and census-designated place located in south Orange County, California, just outside the city limits of San Juan Capistrano, Rancho Santa Margarita and Mission Viejo.

History
Ladera Ranch is a  planned community, bordered by the cities of Mission Viejo and San Juan Capistrano to the west and the city of Rancho Santa Margarita to the north. Located along Antonio Parkway and Crown Valley Parkway, construction of the community began in 1999 on portions of the O'Neill, Avery, & Moiso families'  Rancho Mission Viejo cattle ranch, which was the largest remaining working ranch in Orange County.

Geography
Ladera Ranch is located in the foothills of the Orange County Saddleback.

Design and development
The Ladera Ranch development is divided into nine "villages". Within each village, individual builders develop an area called a neighborhood. There are ten or more neighborhoods per village. The villages are:

 Oak Knoll Village
 Bridgepark
 Flintridge Village
 Township
 Wycliffe Village
 Echo Ridge Village
 Avendale Villages
 Terramor Village
 Covenant Hills

Five of the nine villages have clubhouses themed on a particular architecture style that is emphasized within that village. There are also parks, pools, playgrounds and open areas within each village. The Covenant Hills village is a gated community which is closed to the general public, but accessible to all card-carrying residents of Ladera Ranch. There are no other gated villages in the community.

In addition to the various clubhouses, the community has a private water park and skate park, 18 community parks, a dog park, six smaller neighborhood pools, many pocket parks and green belts, shopping districts called Mercantile East and Mercantile West Shopping Centers, and miles of hiking/biking trails that connect to Doheny Beach.

Demographics

2022
According to the most recent ACS, the racial composition of Ladera Ranch was:

 White: 75.12%
 Asian: 14.15%
 Two or more races: 8.05%
 Black or African American: 1.04%
 Other race: 0.78%
 Native Hawaiian or Pacific Islander: 0.44%
 Native American: 0.40%

2010
The 2010 United States Census reported that Ladera Ranch had a population of 22,980. The racial makeup of Ladera Ranch was 17,899 (77.9%) White (69.4% Non-Hispanic White), 335 (1.5%) African American, 54 (0.2%) Native American, 2,774 (12.1%) Asian, 27 (0.1%) Pacific Islander, 624 (2.7%) from other races, and 1,267 (5.5%) from two or more races. Hispanic or Latino of any race were 2,952 persons (12.8%).

The Census reported that 22,980 people (100% of the population) lived in households, 0 (0%) lived in non-institutionalized group quarters, and 0 (0%) were institutionalized.

There were 7,115 households, out of which 4,418 (62.1%) had children under the age of 18 living in them, 4,996 (70.2%) were opposite-sex married couples living together, 620 (8.7%) had a female householder with no spouse present, 274 (3.9%) had a male householder with no spouse present.  There were 231 (3.2%) unmarried opposite-sex partnerships, and 72 (1.0%) same-sex married couples or partnerships. 927 households (13.0%) were made up of individuals, and 226 (3.2%) had someone living alone who was 65 years of age or older. The average household size was 3.23.  There were 5,890 families (82.8% of all households); the average family size was 3.59.

The population was spread out, with 8,812 people (38.3%) under the age of 18, 892 people (3.9%) aged 18 to 24, 8,639 people (37.6%) aged 25 to 44, 3,802 people (16.5%) aged 45 to 64, and 835 people (3.6%) who were 65 years of age or older.  The median age was 32.4 years. For every 100 females, there were 96.3 males.  For every 100 females age 18 and over, there were 92.1 males.

The homeowner vacancy rate was 1.9%; the rental vacancy rate was 4.7%.  17,572 people (76.5% of the population) lived in owner-occupied housing units and 5,408 people (23.5%) lived in rental housing units.

According to the 2010 United States Census, Ladera Ranch had a median household income of $131,892, with 4.0% of the population living below the federal poverty line.

2000

At the 2000 census, the Census Bureau did not define a census-designated place called Ladera Ranch, but it did define a Zip Code Tabulation Area (ZCTA), 92694. Because Ladera Ranch is contained within this ZCTA, it is possible to obtain Census data from the United States 2000 Census for the area even though data for "Ladera Ranch" is unavailable.

Local government
As a part of unincorporated Orange County, Ladera Ranch is governed by the Orange County Board of Supervisors as part of the Fifth District.

Politics

In the last five presidential elections, Ladera Ranch supported the Republican presidential candidates.

Community organizations 
The Ladera Ranch Maintenance Corporation (LARMAC) is the homeowners association formed to manage, maintain, and govern the LARMAC Property.  LARMAC enforces its Governing Documents and imposes architectural control in the community. Each homeowner in the community is a Member of LARMAC. The LARMAC board of directors oversees its operations. Day-to-day activities are performed by the general manager and supervised by the LARMAC Board.  Two essential committees assist the board of directors in overseeing its operations; the Aesthetic Review Committee, which has jurisdiction over design, development, aesthetics and the character of the community, and the Covenant Committee, which enforces the use restrictions of the community in accordance with the Governing Documents.

Ladera Ranch Community Services (LARCS) is an independent non-profit public benefit corporation (Community Services Organization) led by an elected five member board of directors. LARCS primary purpose is to enhance the lifestyle for the residents of Ladera Ranch through community and neighborhood events, recreational programs, resident led clubs and community groups, coordination of volunteer opportunities and resident communication which includes the management of the community website, resident communication which includes the management of the community website, LaderaLife.com, and the production of the quarterly news magazine, Roots & Wings.

The Ladera Ranch Civic Council (LRCC) is a volunteer group that advises the Orange County Board of Supervisors. The council has no official municipal role or legal authority. The seven-member Civic Council board of directors focuses on topics within Ladera Ranch that are traditionally associated with a municipal body, such as planning and land use, public safety, and infrastructure.

Ladera-Rancho Chamber of Commerce is currently working in partnership with LARCS to promote business awareness within the community through community events.

The community sponsors the annual Fourth of July Celebration, a Summer Concert series, Family Campout, movie night in the park, Spring and Fall Festivals, National Night Out, Christmas Tree Lighting Ceremony and Santa visit, and a Bark, Biscuits, and Brew event, as well as partnership events with local charities and vendors.

There are plenty of activities for youth of all ages as the community is well represented by AYSO, Ladera Football League, Little League Baseball, Lacrosse, NJB Basketball, Gators Swim Team, Boy Scouts, Cub Scouts, Girl Scouts, Venturing, and YMCA Adventure Guides. The community also has a Teen Leadership Council which is composed of 25 youth between 7th and 12th Grades who assist with programming and activities for community youth.

Education
The community is served by the Capistrano Unified School District. A branch of the Orange County Public Library is also located on the campus of Ladera Ranch School.

Within the community are the Chaparral and Oso Grande Elementary Schools and the Ladera Ranch School, which is home to both an elementary school and a middle school on the same campus.

Chaparral Elementary School received the "California Distinguished School Award" in both 2004 and 2008. Ladera Ranch School opened in 2003, and the Middle School received the "California Distinguished School Award" in 2007 and has been nominated again in 2011.

Depending on which part of the community they live in, high school students attend either San Juan Hills High School in San Juan Capistrano or Tesoro High School in Las Flores. Prior to its opening in 2007, students in areas currently served by San Juan Hills attended Capistrano Valley High School. A number of Ladera Ranch's students have attended Capistrano Valley, either due to having begun attendance prior to 2007, or by virtue of having been "grandfathered" in through siblings' attendance.

Private schools within a short distance to Ladera Ranch are Santa Margarita Catholic High School, J. Serra Catholic School and St. Margaret's Academy.

The community is close to Saddleback College in Mission Viejo and Soka University of America in Aliso Viejo.

Law enforcement
Law enforcement services in Ladera Ranch are provided by the Orange County Sheriff's Department and the California Highway Patrol.

Notable people
 Cole Custer – stock car racing driver
 Brent Frohoff – retired professional volleyball player
 Jonathon Blum – professional hockey player, Olympic Athlete
 Mark Sanchez – National Football League player
 Mike Napoli – Major League Baseball player
 Nick Punto – Major League Baseball player
 Omarion – R&B artist
 Quinton "Rampage" Jackson – former UFC Light Heavyweight Champion, mixed martial artist and actor in The A-Team
 Rob Adams – Actor
 Rob Johnson – retired National Football League player
 Stefan Swanepoel – Motivational speaker and author
 Skip Schumaker – Major League Baseball player
 Klay Thompson – NBA Basketball Player
 Mychal Thompson – retired NBA Basketball Player
 Mychel Thompson – former NBA player
 Trayce Thompson – Major League Baseball player
 Warren G – rap artist and hip hop producer
 Will Blackmon – National Football League player
Tamra Judge – cast member of Bravo's The Real Housewives of Orange County
Chester Burnett – retired National Football League player

References

External links

LaderaLife – The Official Website for the Ladera Ranch Community
 Ladera Rancho Chamber of Commerce – The Official Website for Ladera Ranch & Rancho Mission Viejo Business

 
Census-designated places in Orange County, California
Planned cities in the United States
Populated places established in 1999
Census-designated places in California
1999 establishments in California